Varavi District is a district (bakhsh) in Mohr County, Fars Province, Iran. At the 2006 census, its population was 11,611, in 2,422 families.  The District has two cities: Varavi & Khuzi. The District has two rural districts (dehestan): Khuzi Rural District and Varavi Rural District.

References 

Mohr County
Districts of Fars Province